(born 30 May 1982) is a Japanese actor. He will have a central role in Tokugawa Fūun-roku, scheduled for broadcast on January 2, 2008.

Selected filmography
2006 Tree of Heaven
2006 Atagoal wa neko no mori 
2006 Tenshi
2005 Shinku
2004 School Wars: HERO
2003 The Boat to Heaven
2000 Shisha no gakuensai aka School Day of the Dead
2015 Live Spectacle Naruto 2015 (as Zabuza Momochi)
2020 Godai - The Wunderkind
2023 Revolver Lily

References

External links

1982 births
Living people
Japanese male actors